This is a list of airports on the Gulf Islands of British Columbia, Canada:

Southern Gulf Islands
The Southern Gulf Islands are those situated between Vancouver Island and the adjoining US and Canadian mainlands.

Northern Gulf Islands
The term Northern Gulf Islands is used for those islands further north within the Gulf of Georgia region, including those close to the mainland to the northwest of Greater Vancouver.

See also

 List of airports in the Lower Mainland
 List of airports in the Okanagan
 List of airports in the Prince Rupert area
 List of airports on Vancouver Island
 List of airports in Greater Victoria

References

 
Transport in the Capital Regional District
Gulf Islands